Tianjin Port Development Holdings Limited is engaged in port services in Tianjin Port, including container stacking and warehousing, non-containerised goods stevedoring and other various ancillary services. Its parent company is Tianjin Development.

It was listed as red chip stock on the Hong Kong Stock Exchange in 2006.

External links
Tianjin Port Development Holdings Limited

Companies listed on the Hong Kong Stock Exchange
Logistics companies of China
Government-owned companies of China
Companies based in Tianjin
Chinese companies established in 2005
Transport companies established in 2005
2005 establishments in China